Ribes acerifolium is a North American species of currant known by the common names mapleleaf currant and maple-leaved currant. It is native to the Canadian Province of British Columbia as well as to the northwestern United States (Washington, Idaho, Oregon).

Ribes acerifolium is a trailing shrub up to 100 cm (40 inches) tall, with red or pink flowers and black berries.

References

External links
photo of herbarium specimen at Missouri Botanical Garden, collected in Oregon in 1893
Paul Slichter, Gooseberries and Currants of the Cascade Mts. of Oregon and Washington, Mapleleaf Currant, Maple-leaf Currant, Mapleleaf Gooseberry  Ribes acerifolium photos

acerifolium
Plants described in 1895
Flora of the Northwestern United States
Flora of British Columbia
Flora without expected TNC conservation status